Pedal cycles in the Channel Tunnel are normally allowed to cross the Channel Tunnel fixed link between the United Kingdom and France only by using the 
Eurotunnel cycle service, on board a Le Shuttle train. That consists of a minibus and bicycle trailer for six bicycles.

On a number of special occasions since 1993, crossings have been made directly using the bidirectional Channel Tunnel service tunnel, positioned between the two rail tunnel bores. The central service tunnel has airlocks at both ends and a concrete screed road surface.

Construction

During construction, over 200 bicycles were used by construction workers.  These consisted of 80 bicycles from Peugeot bicycles on the French side; plus 125 bicycles from Saracen Cycles on the British side.  The Saracen mountain bikes had been ordered by plant manager Kevin Otto—an initial order of twenty-five had been ordered with the rest of the fleet following on later.  On the UK side, over 850 workers had been trained and issued with passes for their use inside the service tunnel.

During one Sunday in October 1993, Wally Michalski and Mike Turner, working as contractors on the British side, used a pair of the Saracen bicycles to cycle the  round-trip from Folkestone to Coquelles and back again.  The pair took around five hours to complete the journey, while wearing full overalls and needing to carry respirators.

In November 1993, journalists Nick Dutton-Taylor and Damon Brown used the same Saracen bicycles as other construction workers to cycle into the tunnel for an article in Mountain Biking UK.  They were trained and accompanied by the cycling trainer Clive, but not allowed to go the full way through.

After opening

On the night of 2/3 December 1994, a group of professional and semi-professional cyclists went road bicycle racing from London to Paris in aid of  broadcast live on French national television.  This 1994 peloton was led by Henri Sannier and accompanied by Jean-Michel Guidez, Patrick Chêne, Jean Mamère, Marc Toesca, Thierry Marie, Paul Belmondo, Bernard Darniche, Jean-François Guiborel and others.  The group used the service tunnel to cross the channel between Folkestone and Coquelles, accompanied by a STTS vehicle.

On 1 June 2014, Chris Froome rode eastbound from England to France in a video promoting Team Sky and publicised during the 2014 Tour de France season, taking 55 minutes to cross.

On 9 November 2018, Children in Need's Rickshaw Challenge team rode through the tunnel on the first leg of their journey from Calais to Salford.

References

External links
 Eurotunnel Le Shuttle cycle service
 Téléthon 94 video montage

Channel Tunnel